Lisle Arthur Atkinson (sometimes "Lysle") (born September 16, 1940, New York, NY; died March 25, 2019, New York, NY) was an American jazz double-bassist.

Career
Atkinson played violin from the age of four and switched to stand-up bass at 12 years of age. He attended the Manhattan School of Music, and after graduating worked as Nina Simone's bassist from 1962 to 1966. He also worked with the New York Bass Choir and Les Spann during this time. Atkinson played with Betty Carter from 1969 to 1971, and in the 1970s worked with Kenny Burrell, George Coleman, Andrew Cyrille, Maynard Ferguson, Dizzy Gillespie, John Gordon, Jon Hendricks, Helen Humes, Hank Jones, Wynton Kelly, Howard McGhee, Horace Parlan, Hazel Scott, Norman Simmons, Frank Strozier, Billy Taylor, Clark Terry, Stanley Turrentine, and Richard Wyands. 

In 1983, Atkinson formed his own group, the Neo-Bass Ensemble, which included five bassists, together with Paul H. Brown, a pianist, and Al Harewood on drums. In the 1980s Atkinson also played with Benny Carter, Lee Konitz, Grover Mitchell, Joe Newman, Dakota Staton, and Ernie Wilkins. Among his associations in the 1990s and 2000s were Barry Harris, Leroy Williams, Jeanne Lee, and Sir Charles Thompson.

Discography

As leader
 Bass Contra Bass (Storyville, 1978 [1979]) with Karen Atkinson (flute), Richard Wyands (piano), Paul West (bass), Al Harewood (drums)

As sideman
With Roni Ben-Hur
 Sofia's Butterfly (TCB, 1998)

With Joshua Breakstone
 No One New (Capri, 2009)
 With the Wind and the Rain (Capri, 2014)
 2nd Avenue: The Return of the Cello Quartet (Capri, 2015)
 88 (Capri, 2016)

With Kenny Burrell
 Prime: Live at the Downtown Room (HighNote, 1976 [2009])

With Benny Carter
 More Cookin (Jazz Heritage, 1988)
 Cookin' at Carlos I (MusicMasters, 1988 [1990])
 Harlem Renaissance (MusicMasters, 1992)

With Betty Carter
 Finally, Betty Carter (Roulette, 1969 [1975])
 Round Midnight (Roulette, 1969 [1975])
 Betty Carter at the Village Vanguard (Bet-Car/Verve, 1970)

With George Coleman
 Revival (Catalyst, 1976) also released as Big George

With Andrew Cyrille
 Junction (Whynot, 1976)
 Wildflowers: The New York Loft Jazz Sessions (Douglas / Casablanca, 1976) one track
 Good to Go, with a Tribute to Bu (Soul Note, 1997) 
 Route de Frères (TUM, 2011)

With Albert Dailey
 The Day After the Dawn (Columbia, 1972)

With Walt Dickerson
 Peace (SteepleChase, 1975)

With Keno Duke
 Sense of Values (Strata-East, 1974)
 Crest of the Wave (Trident, 1975)

With Ryo Fukui
 Ryo Fukui in New York (Sapporo, 1999)

With John Gordon
 Step by Step (Strata-East, 1976) 
 Erotica Suite (Strata-East, 1978)

With Helen Humes
 Helen Humes and the Muse All Stars (Muse, 1978 [1980])

With Jeanne Lee
 Natural Affinities (Owl, 1992)

With Shigeo Maruyama
 Sweet Lorraine (Break Time, 1990)

With Howard McGhee
 Here Comes Freddy (Sonet, 1976)
 Jazz Brothers (Jazzcraft, 1978)

With Danny Mixon
 Mixin' With Mixon (Cinderella, 1983)

With The National Jazz Ensemble
 National Jazz Ensemble Vol. 1 (Chiaroscuro, 1976)

With The New York Bass Violin Choir
 The New York Bass Violin Choir (Strata-East, 1980)

With Horace Parlan
 Frank-ly Speaking (SteepleChase, 1977)

With Norman Simmons
 Midnight Creeper (Milljac, 1979)
 I'm...The Blues (Milljac, 1981)
 Synthesis (Savant, 2002)
 In Private (Savant, 2004)

With Nina Simone
 Nina Simone at Carnegie Hall (Phillips, 1963)
 Nina Simone in Concert (Philips, 1964)
 Broadway-Blues-Ballads (Philips, 1964)
 Pastel Blues (Philips, 1965)
 Let It All Out (Philips, 1966)
 Wild Is the Wind (Phillips, 1966)
 Four Women: The Nina Simone Philips Recordings (compilation) (Verve, 2003)
 Nina Simone's Finest Hour (compilation) (Verve, 2004)

With Frank Strozier
 Remember Me (SteepleChase, 1976)
 Dance Dance (Trident, 1976)

With Richard Wyands
 Then, Here and Now (Storyville, 1978)

References
Lara Pellegrinelli, "Lisle Atkinson". The New Grove Dictionary of Jazz. 2nd edition, ed. Barry Kernfeld.

1940 births
2019 deaths
Musicians from New York City
American jazz double-bassists
Male double-bassists
Manhattan School of Music alumni
Jazz musicians from New York (state)
21st-century double-bassists
21st-century American male musicians
American male jazz musicians